Ivan Briukhovetsky (died 18 June 1668) was a hetman of Left-bank Ukraine from 1663 to 1668. In the early years of rule his was positioned as pro-Russian policies incited a rebellion which he later joined in an attempt to salvage his reputation and authority. His assessments as a rule differ in the part of Ukrainian historians which are supporters Petro Doroshenko.

Biography
He was a registered Cossack, belonging to the Chyhyryn Company (Chyhyryn Regiment). Early in his career he served as Bohdan Khmelnytsky's courier and diplomatic emissary.  He was elected Kish otaman (1661–3) of the Zaporizhian Sich. At the Chorna rada of 1663 he was elected Hetman of the Left Bank with the support of Moscow as an alternative to already elected Hetman Pavlo Teteria. Briukhovetsky's election was at the roots of the division of the Cossack State and is known in history as The Ruin.

However, Briukhovetsky's reign and cruelty worked against him. Early on he arrested and executed his opponents, namely polkovniks Somko and Vasili Zolotarenko. To gain support he signed the Moscow Articles of 1665, which placed Left-bank Ukraine under direct control of the Tsar. In return, Briukhovetsky secured for himself the title of boyar, properties, and marriage to Prince Dolgoruky's daughter. This treaty went on to be called the "Briukhovetsky treaty" and caused massive rebellion in Ukraine. His popularity among the clergy fell when he suggested that Moscow appoint and send a metropolitan to the Kievan Metropolia.

As his domestic policies failed, Briukhovetsky put the blame on the Russian authorities and sided with the Cossacks' rebellion in an attempt to save his reputation, but it was too late. In 1668 in the town of Budyshchi, a Cossack mob, which led by Petro Doroshenko, killed him by chaining him to a cannon and beating him to death.

After the murder Briukhovetsky , who in revenge tried to kill Doroshenko, and Sirko threw the right-bank rebellions. And soon its forces  fight against Doroshenko as part of the troops .

His daughter's father-in-law was his rival Ivan Sirko.

In Witchcraft in Russia and Ukraine, 1000–1900: A Sourcebook by Christine D. Worobec and Valerie A. Kivelson, appears the story of Hetman Briukhovetsky who burned a number of female witches at the stake because he and his pregnant wife became ill which resulted in his wife's miscarriage.

Legacy
After him was named one of kurins of the Zaporozhian Host and later after resettlement of cossacks stanitsa Bryukhovetskaya.

References

Further reading
 W.E.D. Allen.  The Ukraine: A History.  Cambridge University Press, 1941.

External links
Encyclopedia of Ukraine Entry
Biography in Online Encyclopedia Chronos  

1623 births

1668 deaths

Hetmans of Zaporizhian Host

People from Poltava Oblast
Zaporozhian Cossack military personnel of the Khmelnytsky Uprising
Ukrainian people of Polish descent